Penstemon davidsonii is a species of penstemon known by the common name Davidson's penstemon, honoring Dr. George Davidson. It is native to North America from the Sierra Nevada Range in California and Nevada through the Coast and Cascade ranges of Oregon and Washington into British Columbia.

Description
The leaves often have a paler green, tan, or reddish edge. The flowers are tubular, blue-lavender to purple, and large relative to the short stature of the plant. The calyx is covered with short hairs. Larger plants often flower abundantly, with the leaf mat nearly covered with the showy flowers.

Penstemon davidsonii is included in Penstemon subgenus Dasanthera, along with P. barrettiae, P. cardwellii, P. ellipticus, P. fruticosus, P. lyallii, P. montanus, P. newberryi, and P. rupicola.

Habitat
Penstemon davidsonii grows on rocks or in rocky soils in sunny mountain locations.

Varieties
 P. davidsonii var. davidsonii – Davidson's penstemon
 P. davidsonii var. menziesii (D.D. Keck) Cronquist – Menzies' penstemon
 P. davidsonii var. praeteritus Cronquist – timberline beardtongue

References

External links

davidsonii
Flora of the Northwestern United States
Flora of British Columbia
Flora of California
Flora of Nevada
Flora of the Cascade Range
Flora of the Sierra Nevada (United States)
Flora without expected TNC conservation status